We're All Alright! is the eighteenth studio album by American rock band Cheap Trick. It was released on June 16, 2017. The album's title refers to lyrics from the band's 1978 hit, "Surrender", as well as the theme song to the television series That '70s Show, which the band performed.

Singles
The album's lead single, "Long Time Coming", was released on April 27, 2017.

Track listing

Personnel
 Robin Zander – lead vocals, guitar
 Rick Nielsen – lead guitar, background vocals
 Tom Petersson – bass, background vocals
 Daxx Nielsen – drums

Charts

References

2017 albums
Cheap Trick albums
Big Machine Records albums
Albums produced by Julian Raymond